Fabian Jacobi (born 19 June 1973) is a German politician for the Alternative for Germany (AfD) and since 2017 member of the Bundestag.

Life and politics
Jacobi was born in 1973 in the West German city of Münster and studied jurisprudence to become a lawyer.
Jacobi entered the newly founded populist AfD in 2013 and became after the 2017 German federal election a member of the federal law-making body, the Bundestag.

References

Members of the Bundestag for North Rhine-Westphalia
Members of the Bundestag 2021–2025
Members of the Bundestag 2017–2021
Members of the Bundestag for the Alternative for Germany
1973 births
Living people
People from Münster